The ASU Stadium on the campus of Alabama State University in Montgomery, Alabama is a 26,500-seat stadium that replaces the Cramton Bowl as the host venue for the Alabama State Hornets football team.  The first game in the second ASU Stadium was the 89th Turkey Day Classic on November 22, 2012 in which the Hornets hosted the Tuskegee Golden Tigers. The game was a sell-out and was televised nationally on ESPNU. The Hornets lost the first ever game in their new stadium 27-25 due to a late two-point conversion by Tuskegee.

The stadium's current capacity sits at 26,500 but the project was designed to allow for future expansion that can expand the capacity to 55,000.

Other uses
The stadium also holds a restaurant and retail space which welcome visitors to the stadium and area 365 days a year. The stadium itself will be used year-round with other events such as concerts, band competitions, as well as soccer matches and other sporting events by partnering with the Central Alabama Sports Commission.

Attendance records

See also
List of NCAA Division I FCS football stadiums

References

External links

 ASU Stadium website

Alabama State Hornets and Lady Hornets sports venues
College football venues
American football venues in Alabama
Alabama State Hornets football
2012 establishments in Alabama
Sports venues completed in 2012
Soccer venues in Alabama